Er.Ing. Himmatlal Dhirajram Bhachech, Rao Bahadur -  (1844-1922) was a Civil Engineer in the PWD (Public Works Department) of British India.

Biography
Himmatlal was born into a Brahmin family of Ahmedabad, Gujarat belonging to Nagar sub caste His father, Dhirajram, died when he was ten years old. Although his family struggled with poverty, he received financial assistance that helped him complete his studies. He received a bachelor of engineering degree from the University of Bombay thru College of Engineering, Pune.

Himmatlal worked as engineer in the PWD for many years. In 1892 he was credited with the re-building of the Ellis Bridge of Ahmadabad, which was originally built in 1869. Himmatlal reconstructed the bridge at a cost of only Rs.407,000/-which was significantly below projected budget of Rs. 500,000/- that led the British government to suspect he was using poor quality building materials. An inquiry committee eventually recognized his construction as better than the original work and subsequently honored him for saving the country money.

Er.Ing.Himmatlal was honored in 1893 with title of 'Rao Bahadur' by the Viceroy of India, Lord Lansdowne.

He was president of Ahmadabad Municipalityin the 1890s and consulted in the construction of Gujarat College;Ahemedabad in 1897.

Er.Ing.Himmatlal Dhirajram Bhachech died on September 30, 1922.

Monuments
In 1979, a street in Ahmedabad was named in his honor as 'Engineer Himmatlal Dhirajram Street'.

References

1844 births
1922 deaths
Indian civil engineers
Indian Engineering Service officers
Gujarati people
Scientists from Ahmedabad
Rai Bahadurs
Engineers from Gujarat
19th-century Indian engineers
20th-century Indian engineers